"Clipper" Smith is a nickname shared by two American football coaches who both played at the University of Notre Dame:

 John "Clipper" Smith (1904–1973), coach at Duquesne and North Carolina State; member of the College Football Hall of Fame
 Maurice J. "Clipper" Smith (1898–1984), coach at Gonzaga, Santa Clara, Villanova, San Francisco, and Lafayette and for the Boston Yanks of the NFL